A Queen Mary trailer is a British semi-trailer combination designed for the carriage and recovery of aircraft. The trailer was made by Tasker Trailers of Andover, with Bedford or Crossley Motors tractors.

Description 

Features included:
 Single axle.
 Wheels outboard of load area.
 Side rails to allow carriage of wings upright, resting on their leading edges.

Load was 5 tons "distributed evenly".

These features were a natural result of the intended load, aircraft being typically light but long.  The name is presumed to derive from its length, a reference to the ocean liner RMS Queen Mary.

Use 
Nearly four thousand of these vehicles were used by the Royal Air Force and Royal Navy Fleet Air Arm during and after World War II. It also saw service with the air forces of commonwealth air forces, including New Zealand.

Post-war civilian operators included Silver City Airways.

Notes and references

 Reference to delivery on Queen Mary Trailer, RAF Museum, Hendon
 Crossley vehicles collection

External links
 Photographs of Queen Mary trailer towed by a Bedford tractor at 2 M. T. RAF Lichfield; this is similar to the well-known Airfix model in the RAF Recovery set
 Photograph and brief text, a Hawker Tempest on a Queen Mary trailer following a crash landing
 Picture of a recovered crashed Lancaster bomber being transported on several Queen Mary trailers
 A picture of a de Havilland Comet airliner fuselage being carried on a Queen Mary trailer 

Military trailers
World War II vehicles of the United Kingdom